Juliusz Machulski (born 10 March 1955 in Olsztyn) is a Polish film director and screenplay writer. Son of noted actor Jan Machulski, Juliusz became notable for his comedies ridiculing the life in communist-ruled Poland of the 1970s and 1980s.

Biography 
Juliusz Machulski was born 10 March 1955 in Olsztyn, Poland, to parents, Jan Machulski and Halina Machulska.

In 1973, he moved to Warsaw, where he was admitted to the Polish Philology faculty of the Warsaw University. However, in 1975 he moved to Łódź, where he graduated from the Łódź Film School. His film debut was Vabank (1981), a comedy describing a story of two Polish gangsters of the 1930s. The film was a striking success, as was the science-fiction comedy Seksmisja of 1984. Often seen as either a golden child or enfant terrible of the Polish cinema, Machulski quickly became one of the most popular Polish directors, both in Poland and abroad. His Seksmisja, although significantly shortened by the Soviet censorship, was one of the most popular pictures shown in the Soviet Union in mid-1980s.
Kingsajz, a fantasy comedy made in 1987 remains one of his most important movies till date due to its great social significance. It is in many ways similar to Seksmisja but Kingsajz's message is stronger and more evident. It was also released at the time when anti-communistic society was very enthusiastic about pictures of that kind. Slogans from the film were appearing on many real walls, much to police's irritation.
His ventures just after 1989 were still popular with the masses but none of them was critically acclaimed. His pictures of that time are often called "rude" in opposition to his earlier "intelligent" work. After his Matki, żony i kochanki, a television series many judged the end of director who failed to adapt to new environment.
In 1997 he proved those opinions to be wrong when his Kiler became a huge hit and is now considered as cult movie along with its sequel, Kiler-ów 2-óch. Both movies are crime comedies about a simple taxi driver taken by a police for a famous killer.

Since 1988 Machulski served as the headperson of Zebra Film Studio, he also briefly appeared in a number of films as an actor. On December 10, 1998 he was honoured with his own star paved in the Piotrkowska Street in Łódź.

Filmography 
 Vabank (1981)
 Sexmission (1984)
 Vabank II czyli Riposta (1984)
 Kingsajz (1987)
 Déjà vu (1990)
 V.I.P. (1991)
 Szwadron (1992)
 Girl Guide (1995)
 Matki, żony i kochanki (1995)
 Kiler (1997)
 Kiler-ów 2-óch (1999)
 Pieniądze to nie wszystko (2000)
 Superprodukcja (2003)
 Vinci (2004)
 Ile waży koń trojański (2008) release date - 26 December Kołysanka (12.02.2010)
 Ambassada (2013)
 Volta (2017)

 Awards 
 1981 - Prize for Best Debut Director at the Polish Film Festival in Gdynia (for Vabank)
 1984 - Main prize Silver Lions at the same festival (for Seksmisja)  
 1984 - Golden Thaler at the Polish Film Festival (for Seksmisja)
 1995 - Grand Prix Golden Lions for Girl Guide at the Polish Film Festival
 1997 - Audience Award  for Kiler at the Polish Film Festival
 2004 - Individuell Award for Vinci'' (script) at the Polish Film Festival

References

External links 

Juliusz Machulski at the Culture.pl 

1955 births
Living people
People from Olsztyn
Łódź Film School alumni
Polish film directors
20th-century Polish dramatists and playwrights
21st-century Polish dramatists and playwrights
Polish male dramatists and playwrights
Polish male film actors